Hamry nad Sázavou is a municipality and village in Žďár nad Sázavou District in the Vysočina Region of the Czech Republic. It has about 1,600 inhabitants. It lies on the Sázava River.

Administrative parts
Villages of Najdek and Šlakhamry are administrative parts of Hamry nad Sázavou.

References

Villages in Žďár nad Sázavou District